Anna Jagiellon (1523–1596) was Queen of Poland and Grand Duchess of Lithuania

Anna Jagiellon may also refer to:

 Anna Jagiellon, Duchess of Pomerania (1476–1503), daughter of Casimir IV Jagiellon of Poland, wife of Bogislaus X, Duke of Pomerania
 Anne of Bohemia and Hungary (1503–1547), only daughter of Vladislaus II of Bohemia and Hungary, Queen consort of Ferdinand I, Holy Roman Emperor
 Anna Jagiellon (1515–1520), elder daughter of Sigismund I the Old of Poland